Woman They Almost Lynched is a 1953 American Western film directed by Allan Dwan and written by Steve Fisher. The film stars John Lund, Brian Donlevy, Audrey Totter, Joan Leslie, Ben Cooper, James Brown, and Nina Varela. The film was released on March 20, 1953, by Republic Pictures.

Quentin Tarantino called this his favorite Dwan film, in part because of the "thrilling stagecoach robbery" shot by William Witney.

Plot
Civil War factions along the Arkansas-Missouri border are warned by Border City's mayor, Delilah Courtney, to stay five miles from her neutral town or risk arrest. Quantrill, a former Confederate officer gone rogue, brings his gang of marauders to the region, including wife Kate, whom he kidnapped from Border City two years ago.

Another new arrival is Sally Maris, who has traveled from Michigan to join her brother, Bitterroot Bill, the owner of a saloon. Kate takes an immediate dislike to Sally and challenges her to a fight, which Sally wins, then a gunfight, where Sally also surprises Kate with her skill with a weapon. Bill is killed, and has left behind so many debts, Sally must stay to run the business.

Quantrill's interest in a mine, owned by Delilah, pits him against foreman Lance Horton, who is secretly a Confederate spy. Sally falls in love with Lance, who is wounded in a gunfight. After saving Kate's life during the melee, the women join forces. Sally prevents the arrest of Lance by claiming to be the spy herself. She is about to be hanged by vigilantes, but Kate reveals the truth, then rides off with the men in hot pursuit, saving Sally.

Cast
John Lund as Lance Horton
Brian Donlevy as Charles Quantrill
Audrey Totter as Kate Quantrill / Kitty McCoy
Joan Leslie as Sally Maris
Ben Cooper as Jesse James
James Brown as Frank James
Nina Varela as Mayor Delilah Courtney
Ellen Corby as First Townswoman
Fern Hall as Second Woman
Minerva Urecal as Mrs. Stuart
Jim Davis as Cole Younger
Reed Hadley as Bitterroot Bill Maris
Ann Savage as Glenda
Virginia Christine as Jenny
Marilyn Lindsey as Rose
Nacho Galindo as John Pablo
Dick Simmons as Army Captain
Gordon Jones as Yankee Sergeant
Frank Ferguson as Bartender
Post Park as Stagecoach Driver
Tom McDonough as Quantrill's Henchman
Richard Crane as Yankee Lieutenant
Carl Pitti as Bourreau
Joe Yrigoyen as Prisoner Guard
Jimmy Hawkins as Malcolm Stuart
James Kirkwood, Sr. as Old Man
Paul Livermore as Bill Anderson

References

External links
 

1953 films
American Western (genre) films
1953 Western (genre) films
Republic Pictures films
Films directed by Allan Dwan
American black-and-white films
1950s English-language films
1950s American films